Hsu Ming-Chieh, born December 1, 1976 is a baseball pitcher currently playing for Chinese Professional Baseball League's Lamigo Monkeys in Taiwan. He previously played for Nippon Professional Baseball's Saitama Seibu Lions and Orix Buffaloes. He is known for his Shuuto (two-seamer).

Early life
Hsu was raised in southern Taiwan and joined his school's baseball team in elementary school. At the age of 12, Hsu participated in the 1989 Little League World Series while playing for Kang-Tu Little League. Kang-Tu lost the series to a team from Trumbull, Connecticut.

Professional career
In 1998, Hsu joined Taichung Agan, a baseball club in the now-defunct Taiwan Major League. His outstanding performance with Agan in the 1998 and 1999 seasons has been compared with Daisuke Matsuzaka by the Taiwanese media.

In 2000, he joined the Seibu Lions of the Pacific League in Japan. In 2012, after 12 seasons with the Lions, he moved to the Orix Buffaloes, where he played 2 seasons.

In 2014, he returned to Taiwan, playing for the Lamigo Monkeys in the Chinese Professional Baseball League.

International experience
Hsu has participated in many International baseball events.
 1989: Little League World Series
 1995: Asian Baseball Championship
 1995: Intercontinental Cup
 1997: Asian Baseball Championship
 1998: Bangkok Asian Games
 1999: Asian Baseball Championship
 2001: Baseball World Cup
 2003: Asian Baseball Championship
 2007: Baseball World Cup
 2007: Asian Baseball Championship

See also
 Chinese Taipei national baseball team

External links
 
 

1976 births
Asian Games medalists in baseball
Baseball players at the 1998 Asian Games
Living people
Nippon Professional Baseball pitchers
Orix Buffaloes players
Baseball players from Kaohsiung
Saitama Seibu Lions players
Seibu Lions players
Taiwanese expatriate baseball players in Japan
Medalists at the 1998 Asian Games
Asian Games bronze medalists for Chinese Taipei
CTBC Brothers players
Nippon Professional Baseball coaches